The Lakes Mall is an enclosed shopping mall serving the city of Muskegon, Michigan, United States. Anchor stores are Bed Bath & Beyond, Dick's Sporting Goods, and JCPenney, with two vacancies last occupied by Sears and Younkers.

History
The Lakes Mall was developed by CBL & Associates Properties of Chattanooga, Tennessee, on a site south of town, near the junction of Interstate 96 and U.S. Highway 31, at the southeastern corner of Sternberg Road and Harvey Street. Construction began on the property in late 1999. On August 15, 2001, the mall's grand opening was announced, although Sears had been operational since March of that year. The mall, upon opening, featured Bed Bath & Beyond, JCPenney, Sears and Younkers among its anchor stores. JCPenney had relocated from a standalone store, while Sears had relocated from the former Muskegon Mall downtown. Dick's Sporting Goods was added in late 2004. On April 18, 2018, it was announced that Younkers would be closing as parent company The Bon-Ton is going out of business. The store closed in August 2018. On December 28, 2018, it was announced that Sears would be closing as part of a plan to close 80 stores nationwide. The store closed on March 14, 2019.

Impact on the community
Prior to the development of the mall, the only major business that operated at the intersection of Sternberg Road and Harvey Street was a strip mall known as the Lakeshore Marketplace. This center, a former outlet mall, was eventually redeveloped into big box space (including Toys "R" Us, Barnes & Noble, Old Navy, TJ Maxx, and Elder-Beerman, which was converted to a Younkers furniture store in 2008), and several restaurants soon opened along The Lakes Mall's periphery.

Muskegon Mall, an older mall created by enclosing several blocks of Muskegon's downtown, had operated in downtown Muskegon since 1976. However, it was not considered a major retail draw for the Muskegon area, because it lacked the major chain stores present at the malls in Grand Rapids. Since its opening in 2001, The Lakes Mall has been cited as the most popular retail destination in the Muskegon area.

References

External links
Official website

Shopping malls established in 2001
Namdar Realty Group
Shopping malls in Michigan
Buildings and structures in Muskegon, Michigan
Tourist attractions in Muskegon, Michigan
2001 establishments in Michigan